Madudan Mór Ua Madadhan (died after 1158) was King of Síol Anmchadha.

No details of his era appear to be known.

References
 http://www.ucc.ie/celt/published/T100005B/
 O'Madáin: History of the O'Maddens of Hy-Many, Gerard Madden, 2004. .

People from County Galway
12th-century Irish monarchs